Bobby Graham is the name of

 Bobby Graham (athlete) (1909–1963), British middle-distance runner
 Bobby Graham (musician) (1940–2009), drummer
 Bobby Graham (footballer) (born 1944), former footballer

See also
Bob Graham (disambiguation)
Robert Graham (disambiguation)